The number of national daily newspapers in Denmark was 127 in 1950, whereas it was 37 in 1965. In 2009 the number of newspapers was 36.

The European Journalism Centre (EJC) categorizes Danish newspapers into five groups: National newspapers with large distribution such as Jyllands-Posten, Politiken and Berlingske Tidende; national newspapers with small distribution such as Information and Kristeligt Dagblad; regional and local newspapers, tabloids and free newspapers such as Ekstrabladet and BT. This is a list of newspapers in Denmark:

National 
{| class="sortable wikitable"
! Title !! Published !! Est. !! Readership (2018) !! Owner !! Political Orientation
|-
| Berlingske || Daily || 1749 || 141,000 || Berlingske Media || Conservative
|-
| B.T. || Daily || 1916 || 75,000 || Berlingske Media || Tabloidism
|-
| B.T. Metro || Daily ||  || 264,000 || Berlingske Media ||  Tabloidism
|-
| The Copenhagen Post || Weekly || 1997 || || The Copenhagen Post || Liberal 
|-
| Dagbladet Arbejderen || Daily ||  || || Communist Party || Communism 
|-
| Dagbladet Børsen || Daily || 1896 || 109,000 || Bonnier Group || Economically liberal 
|-
| Dagbladet Information || Daily || 1945 || 82,000 || A/S Information || Independent
|-
| Ekstrabladet || Daily || 1904 || 91,000 || JP/Politikens Hus || Tabloidism
|-
| Kristeligt Dagblad || Daily || 1896 || 109,000 || Kristeligt Dagblad || Christian democratic 
|-
| Morgenavisen Jyllands-Posten || Daily || 1871 || 172,000 || JP/Politikens Hus || Liberal-conservative 
|-
| Dagbladet Politiken || Daily || 1884 || 254,000 || JP/Politikens Hus || Social-liberal 
|-
| Søndagsavisen || Sunday || 1978 || || Søndagsavisen ||  
|-
| Weekendavisen || Friday || 1971 || 190,000 || Berlingske Media || Liberal-conservative  
|-
|}

Regional

Funen
 Fyens Stiftstidende
 Fyns Amts Avis
 Kjerteminde Avis
 Lokal Avisen Odense
 Områdeavisen Nordfyn
 Otterup Avis
 ugeavisen Odense
 Xtra Fyens Stiftstidende

Jutland
 Århus Stiftstidende
 Dagbladet Holstebro
 Der Nordschleswiger
 Flensborg Avis
 Fredericia Dagblad
 Herning Folkeblad
 Horsens Folkeblad
 Jydske Vestkysten
 Kolding Ugeavis
 Midtjylland Hverdag
 Midtjyllands Avis
 Morsø Folkeblad
 Newsbreak.dk
 Nordjyske Stiftstidende
 Randers Amtsavis
 Ringkjøbing Amts Dagblad
 Skagen Onsdag
 Skive Folkeblad
 Skive Her
 Thisted Dagblad
 Vejle Amts Folkeblad
 Viborg Stifts Folkeblad

Isles
 Bornholms Tidende
 Lolland-Falsters Folketidende
 Møns Tidende
 ‘Herplejēctœr’

Zealand
 Ballerup Bladet
 Frederikssund Lokalavisen
 Dagbladet/Frederiksborg Amts Avis
 Helsingør Dagblad
 Holbæk Amts
 Kalundborg Folkeblad
 Næstved Tidende
 Præstø Avis
 Sjællands Tidende
 Sydkysten
 Vordingborg Dagblad

See also
List of magazines in Denmark
List of newspapers

References

 
Denmark
Newspapers